The Clayton Miller Band is an American blues musical group originally from Lafayette, Indiana. The group consists of brothers Cole, LD, and Clayton Miller, along with their father, Larry Miller. 
They are best known for appearing on the first season of the NBC talent show America's Got Talent, and finishing as a runner-up behind Bianca Ryan.

Cole and LD Miller also perform together as "The Millers", along with Ryan Fletcher on flute and David Mickler on percussion.

Personnel 
Clayton Miller - guitar, vocals
Cole Miller - drums, vocals
LD Miller - harmonica, vocals
Larry Miller - bass

Discography 
Live At Duncan Hall
Gotta Have Love

References
2006; Estrella, Espie; About.com-Music education "The Musical Talents on 'America's Got Talent'"
July 27, 2007; Koppel, Shelley; Hometown News (St. Lucie County, Florida); "The Clayton Miller Band comes rocking into town"
November 7, 2015; Ramey, Melodie; Through the Lens Magazine; "The Miller Halloween Bash at Digby's"

External links
Official MySpace of The Clayton Miller Band/The Millers

America's Got Talent contestants
Family musical groups
Sibling musical duos
Musical groups from Indiana
American blues musical groups